North Metropolitan may refer to:

 Electoral region of North Metropolitan, in Western Australia
 North Metropolitan Province, former electorate in Western Australia
 North Metropolitan Region, municipality in Argentina
 Northern Metropolitan Region, electorate in Victoria, Australia